Charlotte Evelyn Gay,  (February 22, 1867 – November 1, 1958) was an English social and temperance reformer affiliated with the Church Army.

Early life and education
Charlotte Evelyn Gay was born at Norwood, London, February 22, 1867. Her parents were Rev. Alfred Henry Gay (b. 1836) and Ada Key (nee Hewitt) Gay (b. 1845). Charlotte had four siblings, Sidney Alfred Gay (b. 1865), Lewlie Hewitt Gay (b. 1871), Ada Muriel Augusta Gay (b. 1880), and Cyril Herbert Tay (b. 1884). Leslie was a first-class cricketer who played for Cambridge University, Hampshire, Somerset and England; as a footballer, he played for Cambridge University, the Corinthians and England. Her cousin, Kingsmill Key, captained Surrey in the 1890s.

She was educated at Brighton, Sussex.

Career
Early in life, she was interested in the temperance movement, and became actively identified with the work of the Church Army shortly after its foundation in Westminster in 1882. In 1896, she was chosen honorary secretary of the Temperance Department of the organization, in which capacity she served until 1915. In 1920, she was serving in the role of Director for Parcels to British Prisoners for the Church Army. By 1925, she was a member of the Church Army's Executive Board, and also served on various committees.

Gay was an honorary secretary of the Church Army's Women’s Preventive Homes Department. During her years of official service with the Church Army, she founded three homes for inebriate women in England, which institutions she personally superintended, until they were rendered unnecessary, owing to the increase in the number of restrictions on the sale of intoxicating liquors imposed by the British Government.

She maintained her business headquarters at 55 Bryanston street, Marble Arch, London, W. I.

Personal life
Never married, Charlotte Evelyn Gay died November 1, 1958, at the age of 91.

Awards and honours
In recognition of her service to the English people, Gay was created an Officer of the Order of the British Empire, January 1, 1920.

References

1867 births
1958 deaths
English temperance activists
British social reformers
Church Army people
Officers of the Order of the British Empire
People from London